Luciano Pigozzi, also known professionally as Alan Collins (10 January 1927 – 14 June 2008), was an Italian character actor. A long-time staple of Italian genre cinema, Pigozzi was noted for his resemblance to Peter Lorre and appeared in such films as Human Cobras, Yor, the Hunter from the Future, Ivanhoe, the Norman Swordsman, Blood and Black Lace, Libido and perhaps his goriest role in Baron Blood.

Born in Novellara, province of Reggio Emilia, in Italy; he appeared in more than one hundred films between 1954 and 1989, including many 1960s Italian thrillers such as Terror-Creatures from the Grave, Werewolf in a Girls' Dormitory and The Whip and the Body. Pigozzi died in 2008, at age 81.

Selected filmography

 Scuola elementare (1955) - Teacher (uncredited)
 The Roof (1956)
 General Della Rovere (1959) - Prisoner
 Two Women (1960) - Scimmione, il capo miliziano
 Gli incensurati (1961) - Carmelo Ruotolo
 Don Camillo: Monsignor (1961) - Segretario del esponente comunista di Roma (uncredited)
 The Centurion (1961) - Corinthian Messenger
 Werewolf in a Girls' Dormitory (1961) - Walter Jeoffrey
 La monaca di Monza (1962)
 The Whip and the Body (1963) - Losat
 Blood and Black Lace (1964) - Cesare Lazzarini / Caesar Lazar
 La jena di Londra (1964) - Peter
 Castle of the Living Dead (1964) - Dart
 Secret Agent Fireball (1965) - Yuri
 Terror-Creatures from the Grave (1965) - Kurt, the Gardener
 Libido (1965) - Paul
 Berlin, Appointment for the Spies (1965) - Leonida
 Agent 077: From the Orient with Fury (1965) - Henchman with eye patch
 War Italian Style (1965) - German High-Ranking Officer
 The Almost Perfect Crime (1965) - Salah
 Killer's Carnival (1966) - Ivan (Rome segment) (uncredited)
 Ypotron - Final Countdown (1966) - Strike
 Diamonds Are a Man's Best Friend (1966) - Max
 Un brivido sulla pelle (1966)
 La spia che viene dal mare (1966)
 Master Stroke (1967) - Billy
 The Devil's Man (1967) - Kew - Scientifico
 Golden Chameleon (1967) - Aragosta
 La morte non conta i dollari (1967) - Judge Warren
 Dead Run (1967) - Van Joost
 The Young, the Evil and the Savage (1968) - La Foret
 Llaman de Jamaica, Mr. Ward (1968) - Lefty
 King of Africa (1968) - Kirby
 Vengeance (1968) - Domingo
 Bootleggers (1969) - Capo dell'organizzazione
 The Unnaturals (1969) - Uriat
 Sabata (1969) - False Father Brown
 Taste of Vengeance (1969) - Bill Perkins
 And God Said to Cain (1970) - Francesco Santamaria
 Hatchet for the Honeymoon (1970) - Vences
 Rendezvous with Dishonour (1970) - Mr. Anton
 Sartana in the Valley of Death (1970) - Paco
 Mr. Superinvisible (1970) - Raymond
 Le Voyou (1970)
 Defeat of the Mafia (1970) - Frankie Agostino
 Blackie the Pirate (1971) - Montbarque
 Ivanhoe, the Norman Swordsman (1971) - Mortimer
 His Name Was King (1971) - Mr. Collins
 Human Cobras (1971) - Louis Mortimer
 I due della F. 1 alla corsa più pazza, pazza del mondo (1971) - Herzog
 Dead Men Ride (1971) - Manolo, the barber
 The Price of Death (1971) - Doc Rosencrantz
 Trastevere (1971) - Righetto, un furibondo
 The Devil Has Seven Faces (1971) - Steve Hunter
 Kill! (1971) - Medina
 All the Colors of the Dark (1972) - Francis Clay
 It Can Be Done Amigo (1972)
 Baron Blood (1972) - Fritz
 The Case of the Bloody Iris (1972) - Fanelli, the Nightclub Owner (uncredited)
 Pulp (1972) - Clairvoyant
 I due gattoni a nove code... e mezza ad Amsterdam (1972) - Killer
 Seven Deaths in the Cat's Eye (1973) - Angus
 My Brother Anastasia (1973) - Pasquale
 Mr. Hercules Against Karate (1973) - Chief of Police
 Frankenstein's Castle of Freaks (1974) - Hans
 Il bacio di una morta (1974) - Berto
 Last Days of Mussolini (1974) - Renato Celio - Prefect of Como
 Death Will Have Your Eyes (1974) - Antonio il maggiordomo
 I sette magnifici cornuti (1974) - Gigetto, the Milkman
 Malocchio (1975) - Derek Stevens
 Il Sergente Rompiglioni diventa... caporale (1975) - Arthur Davis
 Legend of the Sea Wolf (1975) - Thomas Mugridge
 Syndicate Sadists (1975) - One of Conti's men
 The Bloodsucker Leads the Dance (1975) - Gregory
 La bolognese (1975) - Secondo - father of Caterina
 The Loves and Times of Scaramouche (1976) - Husband of Babette
 The Tough Ones (1976) - Moretto's Henchman
 Sfida sul fondo (1976)
 Liebes Lager (1976)
 Sorbole... che romagnola (1976) - Attilio
 Puttana galera! (1976)
 SS Girls (1977) - Professor Jürgen
 Return of the 38 Gang (1977) - Romolo
 Porci con la P 38 (1978) - John
 La ciudad maldita (1978) - Don Wilson
 Escape from Hell (1980) - The Warden
 The Last Hunter (1980) - Bartender
 Notturno con grida (1981) - Paul
 Tiger Joe (1982) - Lenny
 Hunters of the Golden Cobra (1982) - Greenwater
 Yor, the Hunter from the Future (1983) - Pag
 Exterminators of the Year 3000 (1983) - Papillon
 Tornado: The Last Blood (1983) - Freeman
 The Ark of the Sun God (1984) - Beetle
 Code Name: Wild Geese (1984) - Priest
 Jungle Raiders (1985) - Gin Fizz
 Commando Leopard (1985) - Friend of Carrasco's Father (uncredited)
 Operation Nam (1986) - Phil Lawson's father
 Strike Commando (1987) - Le Due
 Double Target (1987) - McDougall
 White Apache (1987) - Cribbens
 Zombi 3 (1988) - Plant Director (scenes deleted)
 Trappola diabolica (1988) - Smuggler Leader (scenes deleted)
 Robowar - Robot da guerra (1988) - (scenes deleted)
 Cop Game (1988) - Chief of Investigations (scenes deleted)
 Alien degli abissi (1989) - Dr. Geoffrey
 Nato per combattere (1989) - Prisoner #2 (scenes deleted)

References

External links

1927 births
2008 deaths
People from the Province of Reggio Emilia
Italian male film actors
20th-century Italian male actors